Batrachosaurus is an extinct genus of prehistoric brachyopoid amphibian that lived in Germany during the Middle Triassic (Ladinian). The genus was named by Joseph Fitzinger in 1837 and the type species, B. jaegeri, was named three years later in 1840. It may have been the same animal as Mastodonsaurus.

See also
 Prehistoric amphibian
 List of prehistoric amphibians

References 

Brachyopids